Susan Beaumont (26 February 1936 – 25 February 2020) was an English film actress who enjoyed a relatively brief film career.

Family 
Susan Beaumont was born (as Susan Anna Black) in London. She was the daughter of musical comedy actress Roma Beaumont and producer/impresario Alfred Black, as well as the granddaughter of the producer/impresario George Black).

Career 
Beaumont attended RADA but after only attending for one term she left and found a job in a pantomime after which she went on to dance for Norman Wisdom at the London Palladium and in the musical Limelight. She became a Rank contractee at nineteen and starred as a leading lady in many films throughout the '50s including Eyewitness, The Spaniard's Curse, No Safety Ahead and Man of the Moment. She appeared in Carry On Nurse as Nurse Frances James.

Selected filmography 
 Simon and Laura (1955)
 Jumping for Joy (1956)
 Eyewitness (1956)
 High Tide at Noon (1957)
 Innocent Sinners (1958)
 The Spaniard's Curse (1958)
 On the Run (1958)
 The Man Who Liked Funerals (1959)
 Carry On Nurse (1959)
 Web of Suspicion (1959)
 No Safety Ahead (1959)

References

External links 
 
Cannes Film Festival, 1956-Gaumont British Newsreel (Reuters):

1936 births
2020 deaths
English film actresses
Actresses from London